Coleophora agrianella is a moth of the family Coleophoridae. It is found in Serbia, North Macedonia and Bulgaria.

The larvae feed on Astragalus onobrychis.

References

agrianella
Moths described in 1934
Moths of Europe